Chief Warrant Officer Harold Edward Wilson (December 5, 1921 – March 29, 1998) was a United States Marine who earned the United States' military highest award, the Medal of Honor, for heroism as a platoon sergeant of a rifle platoon in Korea on the night of April 23–24, 1951 during the Battle of Hwacheon. He received the award from President Harry S. Truman during ceremonies at the White House on April 11, 1952.

Wounded four times during the night-long battle, he refused medical treatment to rally his men against overwhelming enemy forces. With both arms virtually disabled, he continued to pass ammunition to the hard-pressed Marines and moved from foxhole to foxhole aiding and encouraging his men. When the assault was finally broken, he personally accounted for each of his men before walking a half mile unassisted to an aid station.

A month earlier, he had earned the Bronze Star for "fearless and untiring leadership" of his platoon in several engagements from March 1–27, 1951. He had been wounded previously on December 9, 1950, during the Battle of Chosin Reservoir.

Marine Corps service
Harold Edward Wilson was born on December 5, 1921, in Birmingham, Alabama, and attended Central Park Elementary and Ensley High School.  He enlisted in the Marine Corps Reserve and was assigned to active duty on April 20, 1942. During World War II, he served overseas for 27 months and was stationed on Midway Island. In addition to his Pacific service, he was stationed at Parris Island, South Carolina; Camp Lejeune, North Carolina; and Portsmouth, Virginia. He was honorably discharged on October 20, 1945, with the rank of sergeant.

Two years later, he re-entered the Organized Marine Corps Reserve, joining the Birmingham unit. Recalled to active duty in August 1950 after the outbreak of the Korean War, he was assigned to Company G, 3rd Battalion, 1st Marines, 1st Marine Division. Arriving with his unit in Korea in November 1950, he participated in the Wonsan landing, and later fought in the Battle of Chosin Reservoir and in the first United Nations counteroffensive. Following the April 23–24, 1951, action in which he was wounded and earned the Medal of Honor, he was evacuated to Yokosuka Naval Hospital in Japan and five months later returned to the United States. He was awarded a meritorious promotion to master sergeant in June 1951 and commissioned a warrant officer in August 1952. In December 1962, he assumed the post of adjutant at the Marine Corps Engineer Schools, Camp Lejeune, and the following December was assigned to Force Troops, Fleet Marine Force, Atlantic, serving as adjutant and personnel officer of the 2nd Tank Battalion.

Wilson was also a veteran of the Vietnam War, serving with Marine Aircraft Group 13 prior to being assigned as 6th Marine Corps District Personnel Officer in November 1968. He retired from the Marine Corps in February 1972.

Wilson died in Lexington, South Carolina on March 29, 1998. He is buried in Woodridge Memorial Park, Lexington, South Carolina.

Decorations and honors
A complete list of his decorations and medals includes: the Medal of Honor, the Bronze Star with Combat "V," the Purple Heart with four Gold Stars indicative of five awards, two Presidential Unit Citations, the Good Conduct Medal, the American Campaign Medal, the Asiatic-Pacific Campaign Medal, the World War II Victory Medal, the National Defense Service Medal, the Korean Service Medal with three battle stars, the Korean Presidential Unit Citation, and the United Nations Korea Medal.

Medal of Honor citation
The President of the United States takes pleasure in presenting the MEDAL OF HONOR to 

for service as set forth in the following CITATION:

See also
List of Korean War Medal of Honor recipients

References

1921 births
1998 deaths
United States Marines
United States Marine Corps officers
United States Marine Corps reservists
United States Marine Corps personnel of World War II
United States Marine Corps personnel of the Korean War
United States Marine Corps personnel of the Vietnam War
United States Marine Corps Medal of Honor recipients
Korean War recipients of the Medal of Honor
Military personnel from Birmingham, Alabama
People from Lexington, South Carolina